The tone poem Pohjola's Daughter, Op. 49, was composed by the Finnish composer Jean Sibelius in 1906. The publisher Robert Lienau insisted on the German title Tochter des Nordens ("Daughter of the North"), which is a literal translation of the work's Finnish title, Pohjolan tytär, traditionally given in English as Pohjola's Daughter. Sibelius then countered with the new title . He also considered calling the work . However, Lienau's suggestion eventually became the work's published title. (The title  was subsequently given to a later piece.) This was the first work that Sibelius wrote directly for a German music publisher. Its first performance was given in Saint Petersburg in December 1906, with the composer himself conducting the Orchestra of the Mariinsky Theatre.

The passage in the  that inspired this work is in the 8th Runo, known in various English translations as "The Wound" or "Väinämöinen and the Maiden of North Farm".  The tone poem depicts the "steadfast, old," white-bearded Väinämöinen, who spots the beautiful "daughter of the North (Pohjola)", seated on a rainbow, weaving a cloth of gold while he is riding a sleigh through the dusky landscape. Väinämöinen asks her to join him, but she replies that she will only leave with a man who can perform a number of challenging tasks, such as tying an egg into invisible knots and, most notably, building a boat from fragments of her distaff. Väinämöinen attempts to fulfill these tasks through his own expertise in magic; in many of the tasks he succeeds, but he is eventually thwarted by evil spirits when attempting to build the boat and injures himself with an axe.  He gives up, abandons the tasks and continues on his journey alone.

Pohjola's Daughter is scored for a large orchestra: 2 flutes, piccolo, 2 oboes, cor anglais, 2 clarinets, bass clarinet in B, 2 bassoons, contrabassoon, 4 horns in F, 2 cornets in B, 2 trumpets in B, 3 trombones, tuba, timpani, harp, and strings.

References

External links 
 
 On-line biography of Jean Sibelius, "The first years in Ainola 1904–1908".

Symphonic poems by Jean Sibelius
1906 compositions
Music based on the Kalevala